Gilman is both a surname and a given name. Notable people with the name include:

Surname
Alfred G. Gilman (1941–2015), Nobel Prize–winning scientist
Alfred Gilman, Sr. (1908–1984), American pharmacologist, co-author of The Pharmacological Basis of Therapeutics
Alohi Gilman (born 1997), American football player
Anne Gilman, American artist
Arthur Gilman (educator) (1837-1909), worked mostly in Massachusetts
Arthur D. Gilman (1821–1882), Boston architect
Benjamin A. Gilman (1922–2016), United States representative from New York
Benjamin Ives Gilman (1852-1933), Boston Museum curator
Benjamin Ives Gilman (1766) (1766-1833), shipbuilder and politician from Ohio
Billy Gilman, country singer
Caroline Howard Gilman, United States author
Charlotte Perkins Gilman, turn-of-the-century feminist author
Charles Gilman (disambiguation), several persons
Daniel Coit Gilman, American educator
Daniel Hunt Gilman, American railroad builder
Dorothy Gilman, American author
, organ builders from Kornelimünster
Felix Gilman, American author
Franklin Gilman (1825-1880), American politician and farmer
Fred Gilman, the Buhl Professor at Carnegie Mellon University 
George G. Gilman, author of Western novels
Harold Gilman (1876–1919), British artist
Henry Gilman, American organic chemist
Howard Gilman, industrialist (Gilman Paper Company), philanthropist
James Gilman (cricketer) (1879–1976), English cricketer
John Taylor Gilman (1753–1828), Continental Congress member from New Hampshire, Governor of New Hampshire
John M. Gilman (1824-1906), American politician lawyer
Joseph Gilman (1738), (1738-1806), pioneer settler and judge of Ohio
Kip Gilman (born 1946), American television actor
Laura Anne Gilman, American author
Laurence Gilman (born 1965), Canadian ice hockey executive
Lawrence Gilman (1878–1939), American author and music critic
Lyla Beatrix Christabel Gilman (born 2010), granddaughter of Prince Richard, Duke of Gloucester 
Marcus D. Gilman (1820-1889), American politician and businessman
Nicholas Gilman, one of the signers of the United States Constitution; United States Senator from New Hampshire
Phoebe Gilman, American children's book author
Ronald Lee Gilman, judge on the United States Court of Appeals for the Sixth Circuit
Sam Gilman (1915–1985), American film and television actor
Sander Gilman (born 1944), cultural and literary historian
Sarah Gilman (born 1996), American actress
Theodore P. Gilman, NYS Comptroller 1900
Tristram Gilman (1735–1809), minister
Wilma Anderson Gilman (1881-1971), American concert pianist, music teacher, clubwoman
Winthrop Sargent Gilman (1808–1884), banker, abolitionist, Gilman, Son & Co., New York City

Given name
Gilman Marston, United States senator from New Hampshire
Gilman Louie, venture capitalist
George Gilman Fogg, United States senator from New Hampshire